Oh God, Women Are So Loving or Dieu, que les femmes sont amoureuses... is a 1994 French comedy film, directed and written by Magali Clément.

Plot
Anne is a divorced woman and mother of three children, overwhelmed by her family and professional life (she works for television). Between Daniel, her ex-husband and Regis, her frequently absent lover, Arthur reappears in her life, a man she had not seen for eight years.

Cast

 Catherine Jacob as Anne
 Mathieu Carrière as Daniel
 Étienne Chicot as Arthur
 Jean-Pierre Malo as Regis
 Yves Beneyton as Jacques
 Fiona Gélin as Marylou
 Pascale Audret as Mama
 Grace De Capitani as Cathy
 Judith Rémy as Mercedes
 Cathy Bodet as Eva
 David Carré as Simon
 Léa Jarleton as Lolotte
 Justine Jarleton as Lily
 Henri-Edouard Osinski as Pierre-Louis
 John Fernie as Hervé
 Alain Bert as Bob
 Pasquale D'Inca as Nathan
 Mélanie Laforie as Cléa

Production
This is the last movie directed by Magali Clément. She die, 5 month after the movie was released.

References

External links

1994 films
1990s French-language films
1994 comedy films
French comedy films
1990s French films